Frederick Ernest "Fritz" Triebel  (December 29, 1865 – 1944 )  American sculptor, best remembered for his two works, marble statues of George Laird Shoup and Henry Mower Rice, located in the National Statuary Hall Collection in Washington D.C.  He was born in Peoria, Illinois, where his father was a monument maker.  His father had been apprenticed as a stone carver in Germany before immigrating to the United States and it was likely from him that Triebel learned the rudiments of sculpting.

At the age of 16 Triebel was apprenticed to a stone carver in Chicago, and from there he moved to first New York and then Boston.  In 1882 he won a scholarship to attend the Royal Academy of Fine Arts in Florence, Italy where he attended and prospered. While there he married Santina Grosse.  Their first two children, Dante and Beatrice were born in Italy.  In the early 1890s Triebel was invited to be a part of the international sculpture selection jury for the World's Columbian Exposition.  He also exhibited six works at the exposition.

Selected works
 regimental and central monuments to Iowa Union soldiers, Shiloh National Military Park, 1906
 bronze statue of Robert G. Ingersoll, Peoria, Illinois, 1911
 bronze works featured on the Mississippi State Memorial, Vicksburg National Military Park, Vicksburg, Mississippi, 1912

References

External links
 

1865 births
1944 deaths
Artists from Peoria, Illinois
American people of German descent
20th-century American sculptors
20th-century male artists
19th-century American sculptors
19th-century male artists
American male sculptors
Sculptors from Illinois